LLC "Aerolimousine" is an airline based in Russia. It operates VIP charter flights and air-taxi services out of Moscow Domodedovo Airport.

Fleet 
As of July 2012 the Aerolimousine fleet included the following aircraft: 
1 Hawker 125-700 (RA-02810)
3 Yakovlev Yak-40 (RA-87908, RA-87496, RA-87938)

External links

References 

Airlines of Russia
Companies based in Moscow
Airlines established in 1998
Russian companies established in 1998